A list of films produced by the Marathi language film industry based in Maharashtra in the year 1971.

1971 Releases
A list of Marathi films released in 1971.

References

Lists of 1971 films by country or language
1971 in Indian cinema
1971